Qiu Mingyang is a Chinese paralympic cross country skier. He competed in the 20 kilometre classical event at the 2022 Winter Paralympics, winning the bronze medal.

References 

Living people
Place of birth missing (living people)
Year of birth missing (living people)
Cross-country skiers at the 2022 Winter Paralympics
Medalists at the 2022 Winter Paralympics
Paralympic bronze medalists for China
Paralympic medalists in cross-country skiing